John Duncan Snedden (born 3 February 1942 in Bonnybridge, Scotland), is a Scottish footballer who played as a centre half in the Football League.

References

External links

1942 births
Living people
Scottish footballers
Association football defenders
Arsenal F.C. players
Leyton Orient F.C. players
Charlton Athletic F.C. players
Halifax Town A.F.C. players
English Football League players
Port Elizabeth City F.C. players